Peter Raffl (born 2 February 1960) is a former Austrian ice hockey player and coach. He competed in the men's tournaments at the 1984 Winter Olympics and the 1988 Winter Olympics.

References

External links

1960 births
Living people
Austrian ice hockey coaches
Austrian ice hockey forwards
EC VSV players
Ice hockey players at the 1984 Winter Olympics
Ice hockey players at the 1988 Winter Olympics
Olympic ice hockey players of Austria
Sportspeople from Villach